Lorene Mann (born Lillian Lorene Mann; January 4, 1937 – May 24, 2013) was an American country music singer and songwriter. She is known for her duets with Justin Tubb and Archie Campbell.

Biography
Mann was born January 4, 1937, in Huntland, Tennessee, as the youngest of ten children. After moving to Nashville, Tennessee, in 1956, Mann wrote "Left to Right", a top 10 hit by Kitty Wells in 1960. She also wrote "Don't Go Near the Indians" by Rex Allen (#4, 1962), "Something Precious" by Skeeter Davis (#23, 1962), and "My Wife's House" by Jerry Wallace (#9, 1974).

Between 1965 and 1969, Mann recorded for RCA Victor. She recorded two duet albums, Together and Alone with Justin Tubb in 1966, and Tell It Like It Is with Archie Campbell in 1968. Singles from the albums entered the Hot Country Songs chart. "Hurry, Mr. Peters", a duet with Tubb, was an answer song to "Yes, Mr. Peters" by Roy Drusky and Priscilla Mitchell. Her only solo album, A Mann Named Lorene, was released in 1969. She had songs recorded by artists who are members of the Country Music Hall of Fame, the Cowboy Hall of Fame and the Disc Jockey Hall of Fame.

Mann was a co-founder of the Nashville Songwriters Association International (NSAI) and created their slogan, "It All Begins With a Song". She appeared as herself in the 1966 movie Music City U.S.A.. She portrayed one of The Delores Sisters singing group, in the 1975 movie W.W. and the Dixie Dancekings. Her television credits in the 1960s included The Bobby Lord Show, Opry Almanac, American Swing-a-Round, and The Stu Phillips Show.

Mann died on May 24, 2013, after suffering a stroke earlier in the week, at the age of 76.

Discography

Albums

Singles

References

1937 births
2013 deaths
American women country singers
American country singer-songwriters
People from Franklin County, Tennessee
RCA Victor artists
Singer-songwriters from Tennessee
Country musicians from Tennessee
21st-century American women